Launceston City Council (or City of Launceston) is a local government body in Tasmania, located in the city and surrounds of Launceston in the north of the state. The Launceston local government area is classified as urban and has a population of 67,449, which also encompasses the localities including Lilydale, Targa and through to Swan Bay on the eastern side of the Tamar River.

Government
The current mayor is Danny Gibson, who succeeded Albert Van Zetten at the 2022 local government elections. Previous mayor, Janie Dickenson, was, at the time of her election, the youngest female mayor in Australia. She was first elected mayor in February 2002 at the age of 27.

History and attributes
Launceston is classified as urban, regional and medium (URM) under the Australian Classification of Local Governments. The population at the 2016 Census was over 65,000, making Launceston the most populous of the 29 local government areas in Tasmania.

The municipality logo features the now extinct Tasmanian tiger, an indigenous marsupial that used to be prevalent in the Launceston district.

History
Launceston was first declared as a municipality in 1853 and declared a city in 1888. Its original boundaries have long since been redefined and the area now known as the City of Launceston includes parts of the former Lilydale, St Leonard's, Evandale and Westbury Municipalities. In the 1890s, the municipality grew to include Galvin Town (South Launceston) and in 1906 to include the northern suburbs of Invermay, Mowbray and Trevallyn. This has produced a local government area that overlaps its similarly named city, rather than either being contained by or encompassing it.

Localities

Suburbs of the city of Launceston
•	
•	
•	
•	
•	
•	
•	
•	
•	
•	
•	
•	
•	
•	
•	
•	
•	
•	
•	
•	
•

Localities other than suburbs
•	
•	
•	
•	
•	
•	
•	
•	
•	
•	
•	
•	
•	
•	
•	
•	
•	
•	
•	
•	
•	
•	
•	
•	
•	
•	
•	
•	
•	
•

See also
List of local government areas of Tasmania

References

External links
Launceston City Council official website
Local Government Association Tasmania
Tasmanian Electoral Commission - local government

 
Launceston